Cheshmeh Qoroq-e Chin (also Romanized as Cheshmeh Qoroq-e Chīn; also known as Cheshmeh Qoroq-e Ḩoseyn) is a village in Qarah Chaman Rural District, Arzhan District, Shiraz County, Fars Province, Iran. At the 2006 census, its population was 69, in 16 families.

References 

Populated places in Shiraz County